The Tweed Range is a mountain range which is the western extension of the Tweed Volcano caldera rim, part of the Scenic Rim of the Great Dividing Range, located in northern New South Wales, near the southeastern border of Queensland, in Australia.

Location and features
The range marks the southern extent of the Scenic Rim. To the west lies McPherson Range and Levers Plateau, in the north is the Lamington Plateau with the Nightcap Range extending around the southern parts of the caldera rim, south east of the Tweed Range.

Most of the range is covered by rainforest and protected within the Border Ranges National Park, part of the Gondwana Rainforests of Australia and Mebbin State Forest.

In the east, the catchments of Byrrill Creek, Oxley River and Rous River, tributaries of the Tweed River drain the steep valley slopes. In the west, a series of creeks, among them Brindle Creek, flow into the Richmond River.

See also

 List of mountains in Australia

References

Tweed Heads, New South Wales
Great Dividing Range